The PM-84 Glauberyt is a Polish submachine gun. It is a personal weapon intended for combat and self-defence at ranges up to 150 m with single shot or fully automatic fire mode. It features a compact design, minimum overall dimensions, small weight, very good accuracy, and fire stability. It is designed for heavy weapons platoons personnel and reconnaissance detachments, special anti-terrorist and police troops.

In service with the Polish military and police it replaced the earlier PM-63 RAK submachine gun.

Operation 

The Glauberyt is a select-fire, straight blowback-operated firearm that fires from the closed bolt position. Its design influence can be seen to mimic the Uzi. However it features a last shot bolt hold open/release like modern service pistols unlike any other submachine guns of its time. The PM-84/PM-84P also features ambidextrous charging handles on both sides (influenced by the vz.61 Škorpion). A two-bar retractable buttstock tucks right into the side of the weapon. The magazine release is in the heel of the pistol grip. The Glauberyt feeds from 15-round flush magazines and 25-round extended magazines. Fire selector Z = SAFE, P = SEMI, C = FULL AUTO, and sits above rear of the pistol grip. When the firearm is on SAFE, the bolt is locked and prevented from moving. A folding fore grip rests in front of the trigger guard (in the style of the PM-63 RAK), and an optional tactical flashlight/laser grip can also be mounted, replacing the folding fore grip.

Modern PM-98/PM-06 variants utilize a thumb magazine release. A new slot in the magazine is required to be cut out to work in the later Glauberyts.

Variants 

 PM-84: Original 9×18mm Makarov model, replacing PM-63 RAK service.
 PM-84P: 9×19mm Parabellum model, 1993 production onwards.
 PM-98: Model onwards, has the magazine release relocated to the thumb position, the charging handle is redesigned to be on the left side only, a more robust receiver and retractable butt stock, enlarged trigger guard for winter gloves, optional light/laser foregrip.
 PM-98S: Special model where rate of fire increased to 770 rounds per minute in full auto.
 PM-06: Features a new 3 position telescopic butt stock that pulls out straight, a see through MIL-STD-1913 top rail to facilitate optical reflex sights, hooded front sight.
 PM96S: Civilian semi-automatic only model of the PM84P
 BRS-99: Civilian semi-automatic only model of the Glauberyt.

Users

 : Indonesian police use PM-98.
 : 6,000 PM-98s were sold to Iraq in mid-2000.
 : 10 PM-84P in use by Lithuanian Army.
 : Philippine police use PM-98.
 : Around 50,000 PM-84P, PM-98 and PM-06 are used in Polish Armed Forces, Military Gendarmerie and Policja.

See also
 BXP
 MPi 69
 PM-63 RAK
 PM-9
 Uzi
 vz.61

References

External links

 Fabryka Broni "Łucznik" Radom home page 
 PM-98 at lucznik.com
 Modern Firearms
 History of the Glauberyt SMG

9×18mm Makarov submachine guns
9mm Parabellum submachine guns
Telescoping bolt submachine guns
Submachine guns of Poland
Weapons and ammunition introduced in 1984